Deveron Carr (born August 10, 1990) is a former American football cornerback. He played college football for Arizona State, and signed with the Tampa Bay Buccaneers in 2013 as an undrafted free agent. Carr has also been a member of the Indianapolis Colts.

College career
Carr played college football at Arizona State.

Professional career

Tampa Bay Buccaneers
On April 29, 2013, Carr was signed as an undrafted free agent by the Tampa Bay Buccaneers. He played in 9 games for the Buccaneers before being waived on August 26, 2014.

Indianapolis Colts
On March 23, 2015, Carr was signed by the Indianapolis Colts following the inaugural NFL Veteran Combine.

Washington Redskins
On October 12, 2015, Carr signed with the practice squad of the Washington Redskins. On November 23, 2015, he was released.

Kansas City Chiefs 
On January 14, 2016, Carr signed a futures contract with the Kansas City Chiefs. On September 3, 2016, he was released by the Chiefs.

References

External links
Tampa Bay Buccaneers bio
Arizona State Sun Devils bio

1990 births
Living people
Players of American football from Scottsdale, Arizona
American football cornerbacks
Arizona State Sun Devils football players
Tampa Bay Buccaneers players
Indianapolis Colts players
Washington Redskins players
Kansas City Chiefs players